The following is a list of colonial governors in 1850 grouped by the European empire under which they belonged.

Portugal
 Angola – Adrião da Silveiro Pinto, Governor-General of Angola (1848–1851)

United Kingdom
 Bahamas – John Gregory, Governor of the Bahamas (1849–1854)
 Ceylon – 
 George Byng, Governor of Ceylon (1847–1850)
 George William Anderson, Governor of Ceylon (1850–1855)
 Malta – Richard More O'Ferrall, Governor of Malta (1847–1851)
New South Wales – Lieutenant Colonel Charles FitzRoy, Governor of New South Wales (1846–1855)
 Punjab – John Lawrence, Governor of Punjab (1849–1859)
 South Australia – Sir Henry Fox Young, Governor of South Australia (1848–1854)
 Western Australia – Captain Charles Fitzgerald, Governor of Western Australia (1848–1855)

Colonial governors
Colonial governors
1850